Birgitta Anna Katharina Tolksdorf (born December 9, 1947, in Osnabrück, Lower Saxony), who changed her name to Gittanna Tolksdorf, is a German-American actress, best known in the United States for her role on the television soap opera Love of Life, playing Arlene Lovett from 1974 to 1980.

Early life and education 
Tolksdorf was born in Osnabrück, Germany, to Dr Heinz Tolksdorf, a veterinarian, and his wife. In 1952, as a young child, she immigrated with her parents and five siblings to the United States, where they lived in Washington, Missouri. After attending high school in Washington, Tolksdorf studied music and drama at Fontbonne College, St. Louis, and took part in the college choir and theatre productions. She became a US citizen in 1963.

Career 
In 1974, Tolksdorf appeared in William Douglas Home's play The Secretary Bird at the Fisher Theatre, Detroit, in the role of the secretary. Later the same year, she was cast as Arlene Lovett in the soap opera Love of Life, a role she continued to play until the series ended in early 1980. She reportedly declined an offer to join The Young and the Restless in order to try out for theatre roles in New York.

Personal life

References

External links

1947 births
Living people
German television actresses
German soap opera actresses
People from Osnabrück
Fontbonne University alumni